Mario Barjamaj (born 27 June 1998) is an Albanian footballer who plays as a midfielder for Bylis in the Kategoria Superiore.

Career

Bylis
In August 2018, Barjamaj signed with then-Albanian First Division club KF Bylis on a free transfer. He made his league debut for the club on 9 September 2018, coming on as a 57th-minute substitute for Beji Anthony in a 1-0 away defeat to Egnatia. A month later, Barjamaj scored his first goal for the club in official competition, netting in the 42nd minute of a 3-0 league victory over Elbasani.

References

External links

1998 births
Living people
FK Partizani Tirana players
KF Bylis Ballsh players
Kategoria Superiore players
Kategoria e Parë players
Albanian footballers
Association football midfielders